Anand Sharan Raturi (born 1919) was an Indian educator who became the first Vice-Chancellor of M. J. P. Rohilkhand University in Uttar Pradesh, India.

Raturi  was born in Godi-Sirai, Tehri Grahwal district in India to Satya Sharan Raturi and Bindeshwari Devi Ghildiyal-Raturi. After finishing his high school in Sirai, he moved to Mussoorie and finished his early education at Ghananda Inter College. 
He joined congress during his studies in Allahabad, and became an active freedom fighter. When India became free, he was appointed Finance Minister of Gharwal State (the state was later merged with Uttar Pradesh). 
Raturi earned his first  PhD from Allahabad University in Economics and his second from Harvard University. He was the first Vice-Chancellor of Rohilkhand University. He combined over 100 colleges in Rohilkhand into one institution

References 

 Amitabh Sharan Raturi
 Bhishma Kukreti

1919 births
Possibly living people
People from Tehri Garhwal district
20th-century Indian economists
University of Allahabad alumni
Harvard University alumni
Indian expatriates in the United States